Here Comes Trouble: Stories from My Life is an autobiography by American filmmaker Michael Moore.

Critical reception
Here Comes Trouble received mixed reviews from critics. James Sullivan of The A.V. Club stated that "[Here Comes Trouble is] a disjointed series of scenes from a life spent making a scene", and rated the book as a "B−". However, Andy Lewis of The Hollywood Reporter stated that "though occasionally uneven, the best parts of Here Comes Trouble are fabulous." Alan MacKenzie of the Winnipeg Free Press gave the book a positive review. Dwight Garner of The New York Times said "Moore's coming of age as a working-class malcontent is [...] something to behold", while also calling the book "shaggy and overfilled". Sam Leith of The Guardian questioned the authenticity of the book, stating "the overwhelming impression is that [...] these tales have been adapted or embellished".

References

External links

Books by Michael Moore
American autobiographical novels
English-language novels
2011 American novels
Grand Central Publishing books